Albert Bandura  (December 4, 1925 – July 26, 2021) was a Canadian-American psychologist who was the David Starr Jordan Professor Emeritus of Social Science in Psychology at Stanford University.

Bandura was responsible for contributions to the field of education and to several fields of psychology, including social cognitive theory, therapy, and personality psychology, and was also of influence in the transition between behaviorism and cognitive psychology. He is known as the originator of social learning theory  and the theoretical construct of self-efficacy, and is also responsible for the influential 1961 Bobo doll experiment. This Bobo doll experiment demonstrated the concept of observational learning.

A 2002 survey ranked Bandura as the fourth most-frequently cited psychologist of all time, behind B. F. Skinner, Sigmund Freud, and Jean Piaget. During his lifetime, Bandura was widely described as the greatest living psychologist, and as one of the most influential psychologists of all time.

Early life
Bandura was born in Mundare, Alberta, an open town of roughly four hundred inhabitants, as the youngest child, and only son, in a family of six. The limitations of education in a remote town such as this caused Bandura to become independent and self-motivated in terms of learning, and these primarily developed traits proved very helpful in his lengthy career. Bandura was of Polish and Ukrainian descent; his father was from Kraków, Poland, whilst his mother was from Ukraine.

Bandura's parents were a key influence in encouraging him to seek ventures out of the small hamlet they resided in. The summer after finishing high school, Bandura worked in the Yukon to protect the Alaska Highway against sinking. Bandura later credited his work in the northern tundra as the origin of his interest in human psychopathology. It was in this experience in the Yukon, where he was exposed to a subculture of drinking and gambling, which helped broaden his perspective and scope of views on life.

Bandura arrived in the US in 1949 and was naturalized in 1956. He married Virginia Varns (1921–2011) in 1952, and they raised two daughters, Carol and Mary.

Education and academic career 
Bandura's introduction to academic psychology arrived by a fluke; as a student with little to do in early mornings, he took a psychology course in order to pass the time and became passionate about the subject. Bandura graduated in three years, in 1949, with a B.A. from the University of British Columbia, winning the Bolocan Award in psychology, and then moved to the then-epicenter of theoretical psychology, the University of Iowa, from where he obtained his M.A. in 1951 and Ph.D. in clinical psychology in 1952. Arthur Benton was his academic adviser at Iowa, giving Bandura a direct academic descent from William James, while Clark Hull and Kenneth Spence were influential collaborators. During his Iowa years, Bandura came to support a style of psychology that sought to investigate psychological phenomena through repeatable, experimental testing. His inclusion of such mental phenomena as imagery and representation, and his concept of reciprocal determinism, which postulated a relationship of mutual influence between an agent and its environment, marked a radical departure from the dominant behaviorism of the time. Bandura's expanded array of conceptual tools allowed for more potent modeling of such phenomena as observational learning and self-regulation, and provided psychologists with a practical way in which to theorize about mental processes, in opposition to the mentalistic constructs of psychoanalysis and personality psychology.

Post-doctoral work 

Upon graduation, he completed his postdoctoral internship at the Wichita Guidance Center. The following year, 1953, he accepted a teaching position at Stanford University, which he held until becoming professor emeritus in 2010. In 1974, he was elected president of the American Psychological Association (APA), which is the world's largest association of psychologists. Bandura would later state the only reason he agreed to be in the running for the APA election was because he wanted his 15 minutes of fame without any intentions of being elected. He also worked as a sports coach.

Research 
Bandura was initially influenced by Robert Sears' work on familial antecedents of social behavior and identificatory learning and gave up his research of the psychoanalytic theory. He directed his initial research to the role of social modeling in human motivation, thought, and action. In collaboration with Richard Walters, his first doctoral student, he engaged in studies of social learning and aggression. Their joint efforts illustrated the critical role of modeling in human behavior and led to a program of research into the determinants and mechanisms of observational learning.

Social learning theory 

The initial phase of Bandura's research analyzed the foundations of human learning and the willingness of children and adults to imitate behavior observed in others, in particular, aggression.

He found that according to Social Learning theory, models are an important source for learning new behaviors and for achieving behavioral change in institutionalized settings.

Social learning theory posits that there are three regulatory systems that control behavior. First, the antecedent inducements greatly influence the time and response of behavior. The stimulus that occurs before the behavioral response must be appropriate in relation to social context and performers. Second, response feedback influences also serve an important function. Following a response, the reinforcements, by experience or observation, will greatly impact the occurrence of the behavior in the future. Third, the importance of cognitive functions in social learning. For example, for aggressive behavior to occur some people become easily angered by the sight or thought of individuals with whom they have had hostile encounters, and this memory is acquired through the learning process.

Social learning theory became one of the theoretical frameworks for Entertainment-Education, a method of creating socially beneficial entertainment pioneered by Miguel Sabido. Bandura and Sabido went on to forge a close relationship and further refine the theory and practice.

Aggression

His research with Walters led to his first book, Adolescent Aggression in 1959, and to a subsequent book, Aggression: A Social Learning Analysis in 1973. During a period dominated by behaviorism in the mold of B.F. Skinner, Bandura believed the sole behavioral modifiers of reward and punishment in classical and operant conditioning were inadequate as a framework, and that many human behaviors were learned from other humans. Bandura began to analyze the means of treating unduly aggressive children by identifying sources of violence in their lives. Initial research in the area had begun in the 1940s under Neal Miller and John Dollard; his continued work in this line eventually culminated in the Bobo doll experiment, and in 1977's hugely influential treatise, Social Learning Theory. Many of his innovations came from his focus on empirical investigation and reproducible investigation, which were alien to a field of psychology dominated by the theories of Freud.

In 1961 Bandura conducted a controversial experiment known as the Bobo doll experiment, designed to show that similar behaviors were learned by individuals shaping their own behavior after the actions of models. Bandura's results from this experiment changed the course of modern psychology, and were widely credited with helping shift the focus in academic psychology from pure behaviorism to cognitive psychology. Moreover, the Bobo doll experiment emphasized how young individuals are influenced by the acts of adults. When the adults were praised for their aggressive behavior, the children were more likely to keep on hitting the doll. However, when the adults were punished, they consequently stopped hitting the doll as well. The experiment is among the most lauded and celebrated of psychological experiments.

Social cognitive theory

By the mid-1980s, Bandura's research had taken a more holistic bent, and his analysis tended towards giving a more comprehensive overview of human cognition in the context of social learning. The theory he expanded from social learning theory soon became known as social cognitive theory.

Social foundations of thought and action 

In 1986, Bandura published Social Foundations of Thought and Action: A Social Cognitive Theory, in which he re-conceptualized individuals as self-organizing, proactive, self-reflecting, and self-regulating, in opposition to the orthodox conception of humans as governed by external forces. He advanced concepts of triadic reciprocal causation, which determined the connections between human behavior, environmental factors, and personal factors such as cognitive, affective, and biological events, and of reciprocal determinism, governing the causal relations between such factors. Bandura's emphasis on the capacity of agents to self-organize and self-regulate would eventually give rise to his later work on self-efficacy.

Self-efficacy 

In 1963, he published Social Learning and Personality Development. In 1974, Stanford University awarded him an endowed chair and he became David Starr Jordan Professor of Social Science in Psychology. In 1977, he published Social Learning Theory, a book that altered the direction psychology took in the 1980s.
 
While investigating the processes by which modeling alleviates phobic disorders in snake-phobics, he found that self-efficacy beliefs (which the phobic individuals had in their own capabilities to alleviate their phobia) mediated changes in behavior and in fear-arousal. He launched a major program of research examining the influential role of self-referent thought in psychological functioning. Although he continued to explore and write on theoretical problems relating to myriad topics, from the late 1970s he devoted much attention to exploring the role of self-efficacy beliefs in human functioning.

In 1986 he published Social Foundations of Thought and Action: A Social Cognitive Theory, a book in which he offered a social cognitive theory of human functioning that accords a central role to cognitive, vicarious, self-regulatory and self-reflective processes in human adaptation and change. This theory has its roots in an agentic perspective that views people as self-organizing, proactive, self-reflecting and self-regulating, not just as reactive organisms shaped by environmental forces or driven by inner impulses. His book, Self-efficacy: The exercise of control was published in 1997.

Bandura on education 

Bandura's social learning theory contributes to students and teachers within the field of education. In 1986, Bandura changed the name of the social learning theory to social cognitive theory. The social cognitive theory still focuses on how behavior and growth are affected by the cognitive operations that occur during social activities. The key theoretical components of the social cognitive theory that are applied in education are self-efficacy, self-regulation, observational learning, and reciprocal determinism.

The social cognitive theory can be applied to motivation and learning for students and teachers.<ref name=Barabarnelli>Bandura, A.; Barbaranelli, C. (1996). "Multifaceted impact of self-efficacy beliefs on academic functioning". Child Development, 67" (3), 1206–1222</ref> Bandura's research shows that high perceived self-efficacy leads teachers and students to set higher goals and increases the likelihood that they will dedicate themselves to those goals.Bandura, A.; Wood, R. (1989). "Effect of perceived controllability and performance standards on self-regulation of complex decision making". Journal of Personality and Social Psychology, 56 (5), 805–814 In an educational setting self-efficacy refers to a student or teacher's confidence to participate in certain actions that will help them achieve distinct goals.

Death
Bandura died at his home in Stanford on July 26, 2021, from congestive heart failure, at the age of 95.

Awards

Bandura received more than sixteen honorary degrees, including those from the University of British Columbia, the University of Ottawa, Alfred University, the University of Rome, the University of Lethbridge, the University of Salamanca in Spain, Indiana University, the University of New Brunswick, Penn State University, Leiden University, Freie Universität Berlin, the Graduate Center of the City University of New York, Universitat Jaume I in Spain, the University of Athens, the University of Alberta, and the University of Catania.

He was elected a Fellow of the American Academy of Arts and Sciences in 1980. He received the Award for Distinguished Scientific Contributions from the American Psychological Association in 1980 for pioneering the research in the field of self-regulated learning. In 1999 he received the Thorndike Award for Distinguished Contributions of Psychology to Education from the American Psychological Association, and in 2001, he received the Lifetime Achievement Award from the Association for the Advancement of Behavior Therapy. He was the recipient of the Outstanding Lifetime Contribution to Psychology Award from the American Psychological Association and the Lifetime Achievement Award from the Western Psychological Association, the James McKeen Cattell Award from the American Psychological Society, and the Gold Medal Award for Distinguished Lifetime Contribution to Psychological Science from the American Psychological Foundation. In 2008, he received the University of Louisville Grawemeyer Award for contributions to psychology.

In 2014, he was made an Officer of the Order of Canada "for his foundational contributions to social psychology, notably for uncovering the influence of observation on human learning and aggression". In 2016, he was awarded the National Medal of Science by president Barack Obama.

 Honorary Societies 
Albert Bandura was inducted into the PSI CHI International Honor Society for Psychology.

 Major books 

The following books have more than 5,000 citations in Google Scholar:
Bandura, A. (1997). Self-efficacy: the exercise of control. New York: W.H. Freeman.
Bandura, A. (1986). Social Foundations of Thought and Action: A Social Cognitive Theory. Englewood Cliffs, N.J.: Prentice-Hall.

His other books are
Bandura, A., & Walters, R.H. (1959). Adolescent Aggression. Ronald Press: New York.
Bandura, A. (1962). Social Learning through Imitation. University of Nebraska Press: Lincoln, NE.
Bandura, A. and Walters, R. H.(1963). Social Learning & Personality Development. Holt, Rinehart & Winston, INC: NJ.
Bandura, A. (1969). Principles of behavior modification. New York: Holt, Rinehart and Winston.
Bandura, A. (1971). Psychological modeling: conflicting theories. Chicago: Aldine·Atherton.
Bandura, A. (1973). Aggression: a social learning analysis. Englewood Cliffs, N.J.: Prentice-Hall.
Bandura, A., & Ribes-Inesta, Emilio. (1976). Analysis of Delinquency and Aggression. Lawrence Erlbaum Associates, INC: NJ.
Bandura, A. (1977). Social Learning Theory. Englewood Cliffs, NJ: Prentice Hall.
Bandura, A. (2015). Moral Disengagement: How People Do Harm and Live with Themselves. New York, NY: Worth.

Notes

References

 Bandura, A. (1977). Social learning theory. Englewood Cliffs, NJ: Prentice Hall.
 Bandura, A. (1986). Social Foundations of Thought and Action: A Social Cognitive Theory. Englewood Cliffs, NJ: Prentice-Hall. 
 

 Bandura, A. (1989). Social cognitive theory. In R. Vasta (Ed.), Annals of Child Development, 6. Six theories of child development (pp. 1–60). Greenwich, CT: JAI Press.

 Bandura, A., & Walters. Richard H. (1959). Adolescent aggression; a study of the influence of child-training practices and family interrelationships. New York: Ronald Press.
 Bandura, A., & Walters, R. H. (1963). Social learning and personality development. New York: Holt, Rinehart, & Winston.
 Evans, R. I. (1989). Albert Bandura: The man and his ideas: A dialogue. New York: Praeger.
 
 Zimmerman, Barry J., & Schunk, Dale H. (Eds.)(2003). Educational psychology: A century of contributions''. Mahwah, NJ, US: Erlbaum. 
 Great Canadian Psychology Website – Albert Bandura Biography
 Albert Bandura discuses Moral Disengagement (in Russian) DOI: 10.5281/zenodo.10808
 Social learning theory and aggression

External links

1925 births
2021 deaths
People from Lamont County
Canadian expatriate academics in the United States
Canadian psychologists
20th-century American psychologists
21st-century American psychologists
Canadian people of Polish descent
Canadian people of Ukrainian descent
Educational psychologists
Fellows of the American Academy of Arts and Sciences
Moral psychologists
Officers of the Order of Canada
Positive psychologists
Presidents of the American Psychological Association
Social psychologists
Stanford University Department of Psychology faculty
University of British Columbia alumni
University of Iowa alumni
Members of the National Academy of Medicine
American educational psychologists